Peninsula Railroad may refer to:

Peninsula Railroad (Maryland–Virginia), see list of Maryland railroads and list of Virginia railroads
Peninsula Railroad of Michigan, see list of Michigan railroads

See also
 Peninsular Railroad (disambiguation)